Narinda is a neighbourhood in Old Dhaka and is a pre-Mughal urban settlement.

Notable sites
 Christian cemetery, Dhaka
 Binat Bibi Mosque

References

Old Dhaka
Neighbourhoods in Dhaka
Populated places in Dhaka Division